George Washington Wilson (7 February 1823 – 9 March 1893) was a pioneering Scottish photographer. In 1849, he began a career as a portrait miniaturist, switching to portrait photography in 1852. He received a contract to photograph the Royal Family, working for Queen Victoria and Prince Albert. He pioneered various techniques for outdoor photography and the mass production of photographic prints as he gradually began to largely do landscape photography in the 1860s. By 1864 he claimed to have sold over half a million copies.

Biography

Wilson was born in Alvah, Banffshire. After studying art in Edinburgh and London, Wilson returned to his native city of Aberdeen in 1849 and established a business as a portrait miniaturist catering to the wealthy families of the North East of Scotland. After some years of mediocre success, Wilson ventured into portrait photography in 1852, setting up a portrait studio with John Hay in 25 Crown Street in Aberdeen. From there, aided by his well-developed technical and commercial acumen and a contract to photograph the Royal Family while documenting the building of Balmoral Castle in 1854–1855, he established himself as one of Scotland's premier photographers working for Queen Victoria and Prince Albert in 1860.

Pioneering the development of techniques for photography outside of the studio and the mass production of photographic prints, he moved increasingly from portraiture to landscape photography in the 1860s. He also produced stereoscopic pictures whose main characteristic was that exposures were very short. By 1864 he claimed to have sold over half a million prints.

At the time of his death in 1893 (he had handed over the business to his sons, Charles, Louis and John Hay Wilson in 1888) the firm employed 40 staff and was one of the largest publishers of photographic prints in the world, competing with James Valentine, who was also a prolific photographer, with a large company in Dundee. The business survived until 1908, when it was wound up at auction.

He died in 9 March 1893 and is buried in Nellfield Cemetery in Aberdeen.

Collection

Over 40,000 of Wilson's photographic glass plates survive, largely due to the meticulous washing and chemical treatments he insisted on. Aberdeen University is in possession of some 38,000 of these, which were donated by an Aberdeen photographer, the late Archie Strachan, in 1958. They date from the late 1850s down to the early years of the 20th century and cover not only Aberdeen and the North East but the whole of Scotland and most of England, as well as parts of Wales and Northern Ireland, Gibraltar, Morocco including Tangier, the South of Spain, and (especially) colonial South Africa and Australia.

From about 1870 onwards Wilson relied increasingly on others to add to his stock. Thus all of the Mediterranean views and many of the English and Scottish series are the work of staff photographers, or were commissioned by the company from photographic firms elsewhere in the UK; and the Australian and South African images were added to the firm's stock in the 1890s by Charles Wilson (GWW's son) and staff photographers such as Fred Hardie.

Reference

Further reading

 Durie, Alastair (1986), "George Washington Wilson: Photographic Innovator and Entrepreneur", in Parker, Geoff (ed.), Cencrastus No. 23, Summer 1986, pp. 21 – 27,

External links

 R.V. Pringle, 'The George Washington Wilson Photographic Archive: a Postscript'
 R.V. Pringle, 'Aberdeenshire Photographs from the George Washington Wilson 1904 Catalogue'
 R.V. Pringle, 'Photographs of Gibraltar, South of Spain and Morocco from the George Washington Wilson 1908? Catalogue'
 The University of Aberdeen Photographic Archives
 Works in the National Galleries of Scotland
 Courtauld Institute G.W. Wilson Samples
 Scottish Scenery by G.W. Wilson
 yacout.info

1823 births
1893 deaths
19th-century Scottish photographers
People from Aberdeen
Scottish portrait painters
British portrait photographers
19th-century Scottish businesspeople
19th-century Scottish painters
Scottish male painters
19th-century Scottish male artists